South River is a village on Highway 124 near Algonquin Park in the Almaguin Highlands region of Parry Sound District of Ontario, Canada. It is about halfway between North Bay and Huntsville  or a 3-hour drive (300 km) north from Toronto. South River has access to the Algonquin Park for canoeists at Kawawaymog (Round Lake).  South River is home of Mikisew Provincial Park on the shores of Eagle Lake.

Transportation
The major form of transportation in South River is motorized vehicles. Highway 11 formerly passed through the town. Highway 11 was re-routed when it was upgraded to a closed-access highway and now passes west of the town, with an overpass over Eagle Lake Road. Construction for the bypass started in 2007 and was completed about 2011.

South River is served by the South River-Sundridge District Airport, which is a small airport about three miles from the town.

The South River railway station was served by the Northlander six days per week until autumn 2012. Currently, South River is served by the Ontario Northland bus and the privately-owned Northern Airport Passenger Service shuttle.

History

Logging in the area began in the 1860s, but it was not until 1881 when the first settlers, Robert Carter and his wife, arrived following the completion of the Grand Trunk Railway. Within a few years, they opened a general store and the new community, located on the eponymous South River, had hotels, a bank, a butcher shop, and jeweller. The river itself provided the power for a sawmill and grist mill, while also being used for log driving. In 1907, the village separated from Machar Township and was incorporated, with W.J. Ard as first reeve.

On Thanksgiving weekend of 1997, tragedy struck at the Hanson Homestead on Eagle Lake Road, when a lightning strike hit a group of eight working on the family maple syrup lines, and fatally injuring Dino Devalis. This strike was brought to light in the 2009 Canadian documentary Act of God by Jennifer Baichwal and featured an interview with Jean Ivens about the event.

Local Industry and activities
Cottagers are beginning to head north from Muskoka to more wilderness locations such as those found at Algonquin Moose Lodge in South River. Algonquin Moose Lodge is a resort that opened up in 2017. The lodge has accommodations for all types of budgets and varied accommodations  such as a 3,200 square foot custom built log home, a smaller log home (that was original to the property) as well as some smaller cottages and even a tepee. This 32 acre resort is Algonquin's last frontier of unspoiled northern wilderness. 
A colourful local landmark is the Algonquin Motel, which uses painted cabins and rooms to attract visitors. The motel has been in operation for about seventy years.

South River is the access point for another tourist attraction: dog sledding on the North Algonquin Dog Sled Trail. Park permits are required.  Algonquin Park Canoe Trips out of South River are also available through Chocpaw, Northern Edge Algonquin, Northern Wilderness Trips, or Voyageur Quest Outfitting.

The Stewart Coughlin Riding Ranch provides horseback rides and riding instruction. A popular swimming spot is Eagle Lake Narrows, which is served by a general store that rents canoes. The Hockey Opportunity Camp, for boys and girls from 7 – 16 years old, is also on Eagle Lake.

The Swift Canoe and Kayak Factory has been in South River since 1989. It employs about twenty people. In the summer, Swift canoes are for sale next to the Tourist Information centre. There are many locations for freshwater fishing for smallmouth bass, whitefish, pickerel, rainbow trout, speckled trout, brook trout, lake trout, splake, ling perch and smelt.

There is a golf course, the Eagle Lake Golf and Country Club, which after decades as a nine-hole course, started expanding. It is currently a ten-hole course. An Indoor Golfer's Club is also available downtown.

The town has a public library. Artists Doreen Wood and Sue Nugent live in South River. Artist Margaret Cunningham is in Eagle Lake. In town, Renée's Café brings live music and concerts to South River.

South River has been home to a local microbrewery, South River Brewing Company since 2009  The brewery has opened a larger facility in 2017 which will encourage tourism to the area, as well as hosting a Brewery Technician School that will teach technique to aspiring beer craftspeople.

Arts and crafts also attract tourism. One noticeable local enterprise is the studio of Groovy Glass Beads, where unique hand-made beads are made and sold. Ron Post makes handmade knives and sheaths. Other crafts are found at The Northern Crafter's Collective, Rustic Blessings, and the Bear Chair Company.

Demographics

Mother tongue:
 English as first language: 95.3%
 French as first language: 1.4%
 English and French as first language: 0%
 Other as first language: 3.3%

References

External links

Municipalities in Parry Sound District
Single-tier municipalities in Ontario
Villages in Ontario